Catherine Schreiber is a five-time Tony Award-winning and a one-time Olivier Award-winning Broadway producer. Her Tony Awards include: Company, The Lehman Trilogy, The Inheritance, Angels in America, and Clybourne Park. She is best known for Company (2022) and Scottsboro Boys (2011). She was named the Broadway Global Producer of the Year in 2017 and has received 11 Tony Nominations and 5 Olivier Nominations. She has also won an Evening Standard Award and a London Outer Critics' Circle Award for The Scottsboro Boys. She is currently a producer of Company (Broadway), The Lion, the Witch, and the Wardrobe (UK), The Play that Goes Wrong (Off-Broadway and Tour), Pretty Woman (UK and Tour), and Fiddler on the Roof (Tour). Schreiber is also the creator and interview host of Broadway and Beyond TV for Reach TV. The Elliott Harper and Catherine Schreiber production of The Lion, the Witch, and the Wardrobe will open in the West End this July.

Biography
Schreiber was born in Queens, New York, and grew up in Great Neck, New York. After Yale College (where she was inducted into Phi Beta Kappa, and graduated magna cum laude, with Honors in English), she worked Off-Broadway in New York as an actress and then moved to Los Angeles, where she got married, raised children and continued her acting career in television, film and stage. She is a producer, writer and actress. As a writer, she has had scripts in development with Disney, Sony, and Tom Mount, and a TV series with CBS.

She is a member of the Broadway League, the Professional League of Women's Producers, and was a former Founder of the Center Theatre Group, Los Angeles. In 2012, Schreiber received the Key to the City of Scottsboro, Alabama for her work with the Scottsboro Boys Museum. In 2013, Schreiber gave the keynote address when Governor Bentley of Alabama signed The Scottsboro Boys Act exonerating the Scottsboro Boys.

Awards and nominations 
Tony Winner: Company - 2022
Tony Winner: The Lehman Trilogy - 2022
Drama Desk Award: Company - 2022
Outer Critics Circle Award: Company - 2022
Outer Critics Circle Award: The Lehman Trilogy - 2022
GLAAD Media Award: Company - 2022
Tony Winner: The Inheritance - 2021 
GLAAD Media Award: The Inheritance - 2020
Drama League Award: The Inheritance - 2020
Outer Critics Circle Award: The Inheritance - 2020
Drama Desk Award:  A Christmas Carol - 2020
Olivier Winner: Company - 2019 
Tony Winner: Angels in America - 2018 
Drama Desk Award: Angels in America - 2018 
Broadway Global Producer of the Year - 2017
Tony Winner: Clybourne Park - 2012
Tony Nominee: Fiddler on the Roof - 2016
Tony Nominee: Clybourne Park - 2012, Peter and the Starcatcher - 2012
Tony Nominee: The Scottsboro Boys - 2011
LONDON:  Total of SEVEN Nominations in 2014 and 2015, The Olivier Awards
Tony Nominee: Next Fall - 2010
Winner: Evening Standard Award, The Scottsboro Boys, Garrick Theatre  - 2014
Olivier Nominee: The Scottsboro Boys, London, Young Vic - 2013
Olivier Nominee: People, Places and Things, West End - 2016
Olivier Nominee: Dreamgirls, West End - 2017
Olivier Nominee: Show Boat - West End - 2017

Additional credits 
Producer: Dreamgirls, West End, opened December 2016 
Lead Producer: The Play That Goes Wrong Broadway - 2017
Lead Producer: The Life, Southward Theatre London - 2017
Lead Producer: Gabriel, The Tour London, UK - 2017
Producer: Desperate Writers, Off Broadway - 2011
Co-Writer: Desperate Writers,  Off Broadway - 2011

Previous Broadway shows 
China Doll by David Mamet - 2016
Anarchist  by David Mamet - 2012
Stick Fly - 2011

London shows 
Show Boat,  2016 Nominee
The King's Speech (play)
El Chico del Oz Peru. Winner 2013 PREMIO LUCES AWARD Best Musical (Peru)

Off Broadway 
Producer: The Effect, Barrow Street Theatre - 2016
Producer: Desperate Writers, Off Broadway - 2011
Co-Writer: Desperate Writers, Off Broadway - 2011

References

American producers
Tony Award winners
People from Great Neck, New York
Year of birth missing (living people)
Living people
Yale College alumni